Square-tailed drongo has been split into 3 species:
 Western square-tailed drongo,  Dicrurus occidentalis
 Sharpe's drongo, 	Dicrurus sharpei
 Common square-tailed drongo, Dicrurus ludwigii

Birds by common name